Sunny Tales is the second full-length album by German electronic composer and producer Roger-Pierre Shah released under his alias 'Sunlounger'.

Track listing

Personnel
 Eller van Buuren – guitar on 'Mediterranean Flower' & 'Catwalk'
 Zara Taylor – vocals on 'Lost' & 'Talk To Me'
 Kyler England - vocals on 'Change Your Mind'
 Lorilee DeSchryver - vocals on 'Your Name'

External links 
 , 

2008 albums
Armada Music albums
Roger Shah albums